Cantel or Cantell may refer to
 Cantel, Guatemala, a municipality in the Quetzaltenango department of Guatemala
 Cantel AT&T, a former Canadian mobile network operator now known as Rogers Wireless
Cantel Medical Corporation, a company which produces and sells medical equipment
 Cantell School
 Kari Cantell, Finnish scientist best known for his work on interferons
 Saara Cantell, Finnish film director

See also
 Cantellated tesseract